Some Girls is a 1978 album by the Rolling Stones

Some Girls may also refer to:

Music

Performers
 Some Girls (band), an American indie rock band formed in 2001
 Some Girls (California band), a 2002–2007 hardcore punk band

Songs
 "Some Girls" (Belouis Some song), 1988
 "Some Girls" (Jameson Rodgers song), 2020
 "Some Girls" (Racey song), 1979
 "Some Girls" (Rachel Stevens song), 2004
 "Some Girls" (Rolling Stones song), 1978
 "Some Girls" (Ultimate Kaos song), 1994
 "Some Girls (Dance with Women)", by JC Chasez, 2003
 "Some Girls", by Bananarama from Wow!, 1987
 "Some Girls", by Madonna from MDNA, 2012

Other music

 Some Girls: Live in Texas '78, a live concert film and album by the Rolling Stones

Other uses
 Some Girls (film), a 1988 American coming-of-age film
 Some Girl(s), a 2006 play by Neil LaBute
 Some Girl(s) (film), a 2013 adaptation of the play
 Some Girls (TV series), a 2012–2014 British sitcom
 Some Girls: My Life in a Harem, a 2010 book by Jillian Lauren

See also
 Some Girl, a 1998 American film